Plinthisinae is a subfamily of dirt-colored seed bugs in the family Rhyparochromidae, containing only two genera. Bosbequius is monotypic genus with the single species Bosbequius latus. The other, Plinthisus, has more than 100 species.

References

Further reading

External links

 

Rhyparochromidae